Harald Halvorsen (16 November 1878 – 11 August 1965) was a Norwegian gymnast who competed in the 1906 Intercalated Games and in the 1908 Summer Olympics.

At the 1906 Intercalated Games in Athens, he was a member of the Norwegian gymnastics team, which won the gold medal in the team, Swedish system event. Two years later he won the silver medal as part of the Norwegian team in the gymnastics team event. He was born in Østre Aker and represented the club Kristiania TF.

References

1878 births
1965 deaths
Norwegian male artistic gymnasts
Olympic gymnasts of Norway
Olympic gold medalists for Norway
Olympic silver medalists for Norway
Olympic medalists in gymnastics
Medalists at the 1906 Intercalated Games
Medalists at the 1908 Summer Olympics
Gymnasts at the 1906 Intercalated Games
Gymnasts at the 1908 Summer Olympics
Sportspeople from Oslo
20th-century Norwegian people